The 2018 FIBA U18 European Championship Division B was the 14th edition of the Division B of FIBA U18 European Championship. The competition took place in Skopje, Republic of Macedonia, from 27 July to 5 August 2018.

Participating teams
 
  

  (Winners, 2017 FIBA U18 European Championship Division C)

  (15th place, 2017 FIBA U18 European Championship Division A)
  (14th place, 2017 FIBA U18 European Championship Division A)

Group phase
In this round, the 24 teams are allocated in four groups of six teams each.

Group A

Group B

Group C

Group D

Final round

17th−24th place playoffs

9th−16th place playoffs

Championship playoffs

Final

Final standings

Awards

All-Tournament Team
  Vrenz Bleijenbergh
  Henri Drell
  Gregor Glas
  Nathan Kuta
  Dzmitry Ryuny

References

External links
FIBA official website

FIBA U18 European Championship Division B
2018–19 in European basketball
2018–19 in North Macedonia basketball
FIBA Europe Under-18 Championship
International youth basketball competitions hosted by North Macedonia
Sports competitions in Skopje
July 2018 sports events in Europe
August 2018 sports events in Europe
2010s in Skopje